Stanisław II Szembek (Latin Stanislaus in Słupów Szembek), ("von Slupow-Szembek") (1650 – 3 August 1721) was a Catholic prelate.

Career 
Szembek was born in Morawica. In 1678 he became canon of Przemyśl and  archdeacon of Zawichost.

He became auxiliary Bishop of Dionysia and Krakow and Bishop and Abbot in Mogiła in 1699. 

He became bishop of Kujawy in 1700 and became canon of the Krakow cathedral. 

He served as Archbishop of Gniezno and primate of Poland starting in 1706. He died in Skierniewice.

References

External links
 Virtual tour Gniezno Cathedral 
List of Primates of Poland 

1650 births
1721 deaths
17th-century Roman Catholic bishops in the Polish–Lithuanian Commonwealth
18th-century Roman Catholic bishops in the Polish–Lithuanian Commonwealth